Rakhi Al-Shammeri (born 15 November 1996) is a Saudi Arabian footballer who plays for Al-Najma as a striker.

External links

References

Living people
1996 births
Association football forwards
Saudi Arabian footballers
Al-Jabalain FC players
Al-Shabab FC (Riyadh) players
Al-Riyadh SC players
Al-Najma SC players
Al-Taraji Club players
People from Ha'il
Saudi Professional League players
Saudi First Division League players
Saudi Second Division players